Víctor Dionicio Joy Way Rojas (born 10 March 1945) is a Peruvian former Fujimorist politician. He served as Congressman, and various ministries during the administration of Alberto Fujimori.

Political career 
Born in Huánuco, Joy Way was a member of both the Democratic Constitutional Congress and the Congress of the Republic. He served as the President of the Congress for two non-consecutive terms from 1996 to 1997, and from 1998 to 1999. He was also the Prime Minister of Peru and Minister of Economy and Finance from January 1999 to October 1999. Joy Way was the first Prime Minister of Peru of Chinese Peruvian descent. Under Joy Way's administration, the Peruvian Congress overcame important international conflicts, including the Definitive and Global Peace Agreement between Peru and Ecuador in 1998. This agreement put an end to more than 150 years of conflict on the Amazon's borders. In 1997, Joy Way successfully participated in the hostage rescue process at the Japanese Embassy in Peru.  In 2000, he was nominated as the “Entrepreneur of the Century" by the National University of Engineering in coordination with the Peruvian Confederation of Private Enterprises, for his contribution to the development of the Nation.

During his political career, Joy Way has been honored with various recognitions and official awards. In 1997, the President of the People's Republic of China, Jiang Zemin, referred to Joy Way as an “old friend of the Chinese people“ during a visit to Beijing.  In 2008, Joy Way received the Grand Maestre of the Republic of Brazil granted by the President of Brazil, followed by the Grand Maestre of the Republic of Bolivia granted by President Evo Morales. He was also honored with the highest decoration of the Congress of the Republic of Peru.

Judicial trials, conviction and release 
An ardent supporter of Alberto Fujimori. After the resignation of President Fujimori in late-2000, Joy Way, as well as many other public supporters and members of his government, faced judicial trials due to their participation in several notorious corruption cases.  On November 26, 2007, Joy Way was additionally found guilty of having participated in the overthrow of Constitutional rule that took place in 1992 and was sentenced to jail by the Supreme Court of Peru.  After a lengthy process, he was finally sentenced for tax evasion referring to his savings accounts in Switzerland. After seven years of effective jail, he was released in September 2008.  He continues to live and operate as an international consultant in Peru.

References

Living people
1945 births
Fujimorista politicians
Prime Ministers of Peru
Presidents of the Congress of the Republic of Peru
Members of the Congress of the Republic of Peru
Peruvian Ministers of Economy and Finance
Members of the Democratic Constituent Congress
Peruvian politicians of Chinese descent